Hao Zhou (born 6 August 1967) is an Australian lyric tenor and theatrical producer. As a performer, he is known for the manner in which his operatic career began (as a dishwasher in a kitchen of the Victoria Arts Centre, Australia), a fluid vocal technique and unusually high top notes, and his ability to perform acrobatics while performing.

Zhou was a member of the Victoria State Opera's Young Artist Program and later a principal with Opera Australia.

As a producer, Zhou produces a variety of original music, dance and acrobatic acts in China and Australia. The first act he co-produced with the Victorian State Opera was The 3 Chinese Tenors, still active in early 2014, in 1992 for that year's annual Melbourne Asian Food Festival.

References 

1967 births
Living people
20th-century Chinese male opera singers
21st-century Australian male opera singers